Joaquín Mora Fernández (16 January 1786 – 26 October 1862) was the provisional head of state of Costa Rica from 1 March to 17 April 1837.

Personal
Joaquin Mora Fernández was born in San José, Costa Rica, on 16 January 1786. He was the son of Mateo Mora y Valverde and Lucía Encarnación Fernández y Umaña, who were also parents of the first head of state, Juan Mora Fernández.

He was married in San José on November 27, 1819, to María del Pilar Bonilla y Nava (1804–1866), granddaughter of Spanish Governor José Joaquín de Nava y Cabezudo. They had five children: Mateo, Catalina, Rafaela, Pilar and María del Carmen Mora Bonilla.

First public office
He was commissioned in Costa Rica in Granada, Nicaragua (1822), a member of the special seat of judgement that tried the royal coup participant Joaquín de Oreamuno y Muñoz de la Trinidad (1823), a member of the Representative Council (1829–1831 and 1836–1838) and alternate judges of the Supreme Court of Costa Rica (1832).

Provisional Supreme Chief
On March 1, 1837, for completing the period of the Chief of Braulio Carrillo Colina and have not yet declared the election of his successor, was named by the Legislative Assembly to exercise the executive branch and the Provisional Supreme Chief. He held this position until 17 April 1837.

During his administration issued a decree that ordered the authorities to move the port of Puntarenas and Caldera to build on it the necessary buildings. It also issued a general rate of salaries and equipment of public officials.

Exile
In January 1839 he was accused of conspiring against the government of Braulio Carrillo Colina and of planning his murder. Vehemently rejected the charges but was sentenced to death. However, the 18th of that month Carrillo decided to commute the sentence of death by the removal of country life.

Puntarenas passed in 1840 on the steamer Eagle, from Valparaiso. Although he made no attempt to land, port authorities demanded that the captain of the ship deliver them to Mora. The captain refused and the ship left immediately. Given this fact, Braulio Carrillo Colina issued a decree to provide that if Joaquin Mora Fernandez reached anywhere within the territory of Costa Rica should be shot immediately.

Death
He returned to Costa Rica to after the fall of Carrillo, and stayed away from politics, being devoted to the management of their coffee plantations. Fernandez died in San José, Costa Rica, on 26 October 1862.

References

1786 births
1862 deaths
People from San José, Costa Rica
Costa Rican people of Spanish descent
Presidents of Costa Rica
Costa Rican exiles
19th-century Costa Rican judges
Costa Rican prisoners sentenced to death
Prisoners sentenced to death by Costa Rica
Supreme Court of Justice of Costa Rica judges
Costa Rican liberals